D49 is a state road in the Slavonia region of Croatia that connects the A3 motorway's Lužani interchange to the D38 state road, facilitating access from the A3 motorway to Pleternica and its surroundings. The road is 19.0 km long.

The road, as well as all other state roads in Croatia, is managed and maintained by Hrvatske Ceste, state owned company.

Traffic volume 

Traffic is regularly counted and reported by Hrvatske Ceste, operator of the road.

Road junctions and populated areas

Sources

See also
 A3 motorway

D049
D049
D049